The Heirtzler Fracture Zone is an undersea fracture zone located south of New Zealand near Antarctica. 

The feature was named for James R. Heirtzler, a geophysicist who was a pioneer in geomagnetics studies. The name was proposed by the Lamont–Doherty Geological Observatory (now the Lamont–Doherty Earth Observatory), and was approved by the Advisory Committee on Undersea Features in 1993.

References

Geology of the Southern Ocean